Commonwealth Elementary School  is a grade school with more than 7,000 students, as of January 2023. It is located in Corner St. Commonwealth Avenue, Barangay Commonwealth, Quezon City of the National Capital Region, Philippines. The school is categorized as large school in Quezon City.

References 

Schools in Quezon City
Elementary schools in Metro Manila